Ayala Malls The 30th (formerly Paradigm as working name) is a shopping mall built and managed by Ayala Malls. It is the first Ayala Mall in Ortigas Center as well as in Pasig and the first Ayala Mall to be managed by Mariana Zobel De Ayala. The mall opened on January 12, 2017.

The mall was named "The 30th" as it is located at 30 Meralco Avenue.

Features

The four-level mall sits in a  property located across The Renaissance and between The Alexandra residential condominiums and the Mimaropa regional office of the Department of Education.

It features four levels with approximately 184 shops, restaurants and services (under Service Avenue). Rustan's Supermarket serves as its anchor supermarket. A two-level open space / garden called Corte, located outside the mall, became a haven for events. The mall has three levels of basement parking.

The mall features entertainment options such as four cinemas (including two cinemas with reclining seats), a Timezone branch and Mystery Manila, an escape room installation.

References

External links
Ayala Malls the 30th Official website

Shopping malls in Pasig
Ortigas Center
Ayala Malls
Shopping malls established in 2017
2017 establishments in the Philippines